Nelson Perez Collantes, known as Sonny Collantes, is a Filipino politician and Air Force Reservist who is the Mayor of Tanauan City, Batangas since 2022. He served a member of the Philippine House of Representatives for the Third District of Batangas from 2010 to 2016, succeeding Victoria Hernandez-Reyes. He was one of the 24 Members of the 15th Congress who switched parties and joined the Liberal Party on June 25, 2010. He previously served as the OIC Secretary of the Interior and Local Government in June 1998, the final month of the Ramos administration. In 2018, the Commission on Appointments confirmed his promotion to the rank of Brigadier General (Reserve).

References

Members of the House of Representatives of the Philippines from Batangas
Living people
People from Batangas
Nationalist People's Coalition politicians
Liberal Party (Philippines) politicians
Pwersa ng Masang Pilipino politicians
Year of birth missing (living people)